The Church of St Peter, Carrigrohane, is a Gothic Revival church in Cork, Ireland. It belongs to the Church of Ireland and was constructed in 1854, and extended by William Burges in 1865–68. The church is located on Church Hill, Carrigrohane, to the west of Cork city. It stands on the site of an earlier church, and is dedicated to Saint Peter. Along with the Church of the Resurrection and St Senan's Church it is part of the Carrigrohane Union of Parishes in the Diocese of Cork, Cloyne, and Ross.

History 
St Peter's is built on the remains of earlier churches, the site having been used for Christian worship since at least the 13th century. Joseph Welland designed the main body of the church, and it was constructed in 1854. The chancel to the east side and later side aisle extension to the south were added by William Burges in 1865–68.  In 1897, the church was further expanded with construction of a stone spire designed by William Henry Hill, which replaced an earlier spire made of timber and slate.

The church was re-roofed in 2000.

In October 2021, the tower underwent repairs.

Architecture 

The church, in a Gothic Revival style, has a three-bay nave with a two-stage tower and gable-fronted porch. The church retains "numerous original features", including stained glass by William Gualbert Saunders and Henry Holiday. The main panels of their pieces of stained glass feature Temperance, Fortitude, and Justice.

The Reverend Robert Gregg was rector from 1865 to 1874 and son of Bishop John Gregg, Burges's patron at Saint Fin Barre's Cathedral, Cork.  Burges's commission, and the church, were modest; he was only asked to design an additional south aisle and vestry; but Crook writes that the design reveals "an original architectural mind.  And the stained glass is predictably good." Robert Gregg would go on to become Archbishop of Armagh.

References

Notes

Sources

 
 

19th-century Church of Ireland church buildings
William Burges church buildings
Churches in County Cork
Church of Ireland church buildings in the Republic of Ireland
Churches in the Diocese of Cork, Cloyne and Ross
19th-century churches in the Republic of Ireland